The Nigeria International Book Fair (NIBF) is an annual cultural event in the republic of Nigeria. It is known to be the most attended book fair in the whole of Africa, being the only international book fair in Nigeria and the second largest international book fair in Africa. NIBF brings together book enthusiasts such as writers and poet that are generally involved in the creation of print, audio and digital books all over the country at her annual fair. The main aim of the festival is to promote and improve the reading culture among Nigerians and Africans as a whole. Every second week of May annually, the NIBF hosts publishers, booksellers, illustrators, authors, exhibitors and readers who displays and sell their books at discounted prices.

History 
The Nigeria International Book Fair was inaugurated in 2001. The chairman of the event is also known to be the chairman of Nigerian Book Fair Trust, who currently is Gbadega Adedapo. In 2012, the 11th edition of the fair hosted about 130 exhibitors with over 40,000 visitors.

The 20th edition of the fair hosted the president of the international Publisher Association (IPA), Geneva, Switzerland, Shiekha Bodour Al-Qasimi, as the Keynote Speaker along with several prominent individuals like the Speaker of the Federal House of Representatives Rt. Hon. Femi Gbajabiamila as the Special Guest of Honor, First Lady of Ekiti State, Erelu Bisi Fayemi who was the chairperson of the event and Africa's richest woman, Folorunso Alakija. Also the Governor of Lagos State, Me. Babajide Sanwoolu who was the Chief Host.

This 20th edition held in the Harbour Point Victoria Island July 27- 29, 2021.  The press conference held in Protea Hotels Ikeja introducing the theme “Awakening the Giant in Women for the Growth of the Book Ecosystem”  featured the physical showcasing of books. The fair had book lovers across the globe, including those who joined virtually.

Festivity 
The Nigeria International Book Fair festival majorly involves the display of several books for exhibition, providing a platform for the sale of these books to interested customers. The festival also features other programmes which includes; teachers training workshop, publishers workshop, a two-day programme for children, principal officers education summit, author's groove, printers seminar and others.

The summit of school owners and principal officers of schools in Nigeria was later introduced in the 2015 edition in bid to make the event a more memorable one for both the visitors and exhibitors.

The 2021 NIBF featured the launching of the book 'Madagali' authored by Dr. Wale Okediran (Secretary General of the Pan Africa Writers Association PAWA.

Guest of honour and theme

Sponsors and supporters 
The Nigeria International Book Fair is in collaboration with the Nigeria Book Fair Trust. The festival is also sponsored by several institutions and agencies such as:
 Nigerian Educational Research and Development Council
 Nigerian Copyright Commission
 Fidelity Bank
 Quarterfold Printabilities
 United Bank for Africa
 Association of Nigerian Authors (ANA)
 Nigerian Publishers Association
 Chartered Institutes of Professional Printers of Nigeria
 International Publishers Association
 Nigerian Library Association

References 

Festivals in Nigeria
Literary festivals in Nigeria
Book fairs